Symphlebia rosa is a moth in the family Erebidae. It was described by Herbert Druce in 1909. It is found in Colombia.

References

Moths described in 1909
Symphlebia